John Weeks Moore (11 April 1807 in Andover, New Hampshire – 1889) was an American editor of musical publications. He also authored a historical work on early American printers.

Biography
He was a son of Jacob Bailey Moore. He was educated at Concord High School and Plymouth Academy, became a printer, and was connected with several journals. In 1834 he established the first musical newspaper in New Hampshire, and he afterward edited The World of Music, a quarto, The Musical Library, a folio, and the Daily News.

Works
Vocal and Instrumental Instructor (Bellows Falls, Vt., 1843)
Sacred Minstrel (1848)
Complete Encyclopædia of Music, Elementary, Technical, Historical, Biographical, Vocal, and Instrumental (1854)
American Collection of Instrumental Music (1856)
Star Collection of Instrumental Music (1858)
Appendix to Encyclopedia of Instrumental Music (Manchester, N. H., 1858)
Musical Record (5 vols., 1867–70)
Songs and Song-Writers of America (200 numbers, 1859–80)
Historical, Biographical, and Miscellaneous Gatherings relative to Printers, Printing, Publishing of Books, Newspapers, Magazines, and other Literary Productions from 1820 to 1886 (1886), a second volume was in preparation in 1888

Notes

References

External links

1807 births
1889 deaths
American editors
American printers
American book editors
American male writers
People from Andover, New Hampshire
19th-century American businesspeople